Live in São Paulo may refer to:

 Live in São Paulo (Sepultura album)
 Live in São Paulo (Richie Kotzen album)
 Live in São Paulo (Astafix album)
 Live in São Paulo (Coldplay album)